Going Public is the fifth studio album by Christian pop rock band Newsboys, released in 1994. The album was the band's second commercial success (following Not Ashamed), and it featured "Shine," one of their most popular songs.

The album was recognized with two Dove Awards at the 25th GMA Dove Awards, one for "Rock Album of the Year", and the other "Rock Recorded Song of the Year" for "Shine", as well as nominations for Short Form Music Video of the Year ("Shine") and Song of the Year ("Shine"). Going Public was also nominated for a Grammy, for Best Rock Gospel Album.

In 2001, Going Public was recognized by CCM Magazine as one of the 100 Greatest Albums in Christian Music (appearing at No. 70 on the list), and in 2006, "Shine" was included at No. 9 on CCM Magazine 100 Greatest Songs of Christian Music.

The CD was recently included as the first in a series of influential Christian albums in Blaze magazine's Blast from the past section, saying that modern Christian artists owe a lot to the path this album created, because it "...showed music from a Godly perspective could sound extremely catchy, have lyrics that were honest and still glorify God".

According to the liner notes the cover photo was taken at a 1948 Post-World War II meeting in Germany which was conducted by the Rev. George A Palmer for the European Evangelical Crusade.

Track listing

Personnel 
Newsboys
 John James – lead vocals, backing vocals
 Peter Furler – lead vocals, backing vocals, drums, programming
 Kevin Mills – bass, backing vocals
 Duncan Phillips – keyboards, backing vocals
 Jody Davis – guitar, backing vocals
 Jeff Frankenstein – touring, keyboards, additional programming  

Additional musicians

 Blair Masters
 Danny Duncan
 Darrell A. Harris
 Phil Madeira
 John Mark Painter
 Kenny Greenberg
 Dave Perkins 
 Wade Jaynes
 Eric Darken
 Russ Long
 Vicki Hampton
 Kim Keyes

Production

 Peter Furler – producer, cover concept 
 Steve Taylor – producer, cover concept 
 Wes Campbell – executive producer, management
 Darrell A. Harris – executive producer 
 Russ Long – engineer, mixing 
 Wayne Mehl – additional engineer 
 Lisa Miller – additional engineer
 Martin Woodlee – additional engineer 
 Bob Ludwig – mastering 
 Laura E. Cobble – project coordinator 
 Toni Fitzpenn – creative director 
 Franke Design, Co. – design 
 Dave Perkins – cover photography 
 Norman Jean Roy – band photography 

Studios
 Recorded at The Dugout, The Saltmine, The Tube, The Carport and Quad Studios, all in Nashville, Tennessee
 Mixed at The Carport
 Mastered at Gateway Mastering, Portland, Maine

Charts

Singles
Note: all CCM Magazine chart information is available in the book Hot Hits CHR 1978–1997 (1997) by Jeffrey Lee Brothers

Music videos
"Shine"

References

1994 albums
Newsboys albums